Cannibal Terror (French title: Terreur Cannibale) is a 1981 French cannibal exploitation film directed by Alain Deruelle and starring Silvia Solar, Pamela Stanford and Oliiver Mathot. Spanish filmmaker Jesús Franco was an uncredited co-writer on the film. Released at the end of the "cannibal boom", the film is a French production, unlike most other cannibal films, which were predominantly made by Italian filmmakers.

The film shares footage with Mondo Cannibale directed by Jesús Franco. Both films share a number of locations, cast, and even dubbing actors. Some connections which suggest more than a mere borrowing of footage are:

Sabrina Siani is the White Cannibal Queen of Mondo Cannibale and also appears in a bar scene in Cannibal Terror. 
Several shots of the dancing cannibal tribe in their village are common to both films and several shots appear only in one or the other. 
One actor with a very distinctive face and a large Mick Jagger-type of mouth is seen in Cannibal Terror in no less than three roles (two cannibals and one border guard) and is also quite visible as one of the cannibals devouring Al Cliver's wife in Mondo Cannibale.
The man who plays the guitar at the safe house in "Cannibal Terreur" is one of the two guys who finds Al Cliver after he has had his arm cut off in "Mondo Cannibale".

In addition to these connections are the obvious cast parallels of Olivier Mathot and Antonio Mayans, both of whom have starring roles in both films. Porn star Pamela Stanford plays Manuella in Cannibal Terror, and has the brief role of the unfortunate Mrs. Jeremy Taylor in Cannibals. She also appeared in a number of Jesus Franco's other films around this time period, including Lorna, the Exorcist. As well, the actor who plays Roberto in Cannibal Terror is the captain of the boat at the beginning of Mondo Cannibale.

Plot
After botching a kidnapping, two criminals hide with their victim in a friends house in the jungle. After one of them rapes the friend's wife, they are caught and eaten by a nearby cannibal tribe.

References

External links 
 

1981 films
1980 horror films
1980 films
Cannibal-boom films
French exploitation films
1980s French films
1980s Italian films
Italian exploitation films